Abolghasem or Abolqasem is an Iranian given name. Notable people with this name include:

Abolghasem Alidoust, Iranian legal scholar
Abol-Ghasem Kashani (1882–1962), Iranian politician and ayatollah
Abolghasem Khazali (1925–2015), Iranian politician and cleric
Abolghasem Mozaffari (born 1967), Iranian military person
Abolghasem Orouji (born 1989), Iranian futsal player
Abolghasem Sakhdari ( 1948), Iranian wrestler
Abolghasem Sarhaddizadeh (1945–2020), Iranian politician
Abolghasem Wafi Yazdi (born 1935), Iranian Shia cleric

Abolqasem 
Abolqasem Lahouti (1887–1957), Persian poet
Abolqasem Najm (1892–1981), Iranian politician
Abolqasem Naser ol-Molk (1856–1927), Persian politician
Abolqasem Salavati (born 1976), Iranian judge
Abolqasem Talebi (born 1961), Iranian film director

See also